Henri Mollin (born 17 December 1958) is a Belgian former alpine skier who competed in the 1980 Winter Olympics and 1984 Winter Olympics.

External links
 

1958 births
Living people
Belgian male alpine skiers
Olympic alpine skiers of Belgium
Alpine skiers at the 1980 Winter Olympics
Alpine skiers at the 1984 Winter Olympics